Jules Timmermans (born 3 March 1903, date of death unknown) was a Belgian footballer. He played in three matches for the Belgium national football team from 1927 to 1928.

References

External links
 

1903 births
Year of death missing
Belgian footballers
Belgium international footballers
Place of birth missing
Association footballers not categorized by position